Lac de l'Oriente is a lake in Corsica, France.

The Lac de l'Oriente (East Lake) is in a basin on the north slope of Monte Rotondo.
Its outlet is the Ruisseau de Lomento.
This is a tributary of the Ruisseau Timozzo, in turn a tributary of the Restonica river.
It is in the watershed of the Tavignano river.

References

Lakes of Haute-Corse
Oriente